The 2006–07 Milwaukee Panthers men's basketball team represented the University of Wisconsin–Milwaukee during the 2006–07 NCAA Division I men's basketball season. The Panthers, led by second-year head coach Rob Jeter, played their home games at the UW–Milwaukee Panther Arena as members of the Horizon League. They finished the season 9-22, 6–10 in Horizon League play to finish in seventh place. They lost in the first round of the Horizon League tournament to University of Illinois Chicago.

Previous season
The Panthers finished the 2005–06 season 22–9, 12–4 in Horizon League play to finish in first place. The team was automatically placed in the semifinals round of the Horizon League tournament, beating Loyola University Chicago 80-66 to advance to the Horizon League Finals. The Panthers then beat Butler University 87-71, granting Milwaukee an automatic bid into the 2006 NCAA Division I men's basketball tournament for the third time in history, and second time in a row.

Seeded eleventh, the Panthers beat sixth seeded Oklahoma 82-74. After their upset win, the Panthers faced third seeded and eventual champions Florida, losing 60-82.

Roster

Schedule and results 

|-
!colspan=9 style=| Exhibition games

|-
!colspan=9 style=|John Thompson Foundation Classic

|-
!colspan=9 style=| Regular season

|-
!colspan=9 style=|Horizon League tournament

References

Milwaukee Panthers men's basketball seasons
Milwaukee
Milwaukee
Milwaukee